Rangpur Cricket Garden is a first-class cricket ground in Rangpur, Bangladesh. It is located on the south side of Rangpur Stadium.

The ground fell into neglect in the mid-2000s but has since been rejuvenated. Rangpur Division has played three first-class matches at the ground since 2012, and there have been three other first-class matches in the same period. Beginning in 2012–13, several matches in the annual national under-18 championships have been held there each season, including the final in 2015–16.

See also
Stadiums in Bangladesh
List of cricket grounds in Bangladesh

References

External links
Rangpur Cricket Garden at CricketArchive
Rangpur Cricket Garden at Cricinfo

Cricket grounds in Bangladesh
Sport in Rangpur, Bangladesh